Geoff Collins may refer to:

 Geoff Collins (American football), American college football coach
 Geoff Collins (Australian rules footballer), Australian rules football player